Devadurga is a city in the sub-district (Taluka) within the Raichur district of the Indian state of Karnataka.

Demographics 

The 2020 population of Devadurga is estimated to be 2.199 million. The population is 51% male and 49% female, with 17% under age 6. The literacy rate is 43%, below the national average of 59.9%.

Sights
Devadurga has a 600-year-old baobab tree. An ancient fort is there. Kyadigera village also has an ancient fort. The Hazrat Zahiruddin Badshah Quadri Al-Jeelani Bagdadi Dargah is there. Jalahalli village has the Shree Laxmi Ranganatha temple and the Shri Jagadaradya Jayashanthlingeswar temple.

Koppur village, hosts the Sri Narasimha Swamy Temple, which is over a thousand years old. Benekal village hosts the Anegudi temple.

Transport
Road construction, which was scheduled to be completed in 2015, is designed to connect Devadurga to Bangalore, Hubli, Hyderabad, Bagalkot, and other major cities. The nearest major airport is in Hyderabad.

Karnataka State Road Transport Corporation (KSRTC) operates a bus service to other cities and villages. Private bus services are available.

Railways
Raichur is the nearest railway station. It is served by a rail line that connects the town with cities, including Bangalore, Mumbai, Delhi, Chennai, Hyderabad, Ahmedabad, Trivandrum, Kanyakumari, Pune, Bhopal, and Agra.

References 

Cities and towns in Raichur district
Taluks of Karnataka